The Arena Football Hall of Fame is the official Hall of Fame of the Arena Football League (AFL). The inaugural class was announced in 1998 and the Hall was not formally organized until 2011. Prior to 2011, there were four classes: 1998–2000 and then another in 2002. The Arena Football Hall of Fame is the highest honor for players, coaches, and contributors involved in the AFL. The voting process consists of fans and current Hall of Fame members voting on the finalists. The finalists are selected by the League Office in which they collect ballots from the Arena Football Hall of Fame Advisory Board, a group which consisted of former players, executives, journalists and media personnel with a long-time involvement in the league. The league began to decline in 2015, so no Hall of Fame announcements have been made since this year. The league folded for a second time in 2019. After the league's second closure, ArenaFan, a long-running fan site, announced it had taken over operations of the Arena Football Hall of Fame.

Qualifications
In order to be nominated for the Arena Football Hall of Fame, a candidate must meet at least one of four criteria (as of 2015, depending upon whether he is being considered as a player, a coach, or a contributor).  A player who has played after the 1989 season must have played a minimum of three seasons. A player must be retired for a minimum of three full seasons. A coach must have been active for a minimum of five seasons but does not need to be retired. There is no minimum number of seasons required for contributors but rather contribution to the significant advancement of the AFL.

Location
There is currently no physical location for the Arena Football Hall of Fame. Unlike the Pro Football Hall of Fame, there is not a museum associated with Arena Football, but there is, however, within the Pro Football Hall of Fame a relatively small exhibit that features the history of the Arena Football League.

Ceremony and Hall of Fame Game
Much like the Pro Football Hall of Fame, the Arena Football League has a weekend dedicated to the inductees and during a selected Hall of Fame Game the inductees will partake in a Hall of Fame ceremony. This ceremony takes place prior to the game and will feature highlights as well as speeches from each of the inductees. Recent Hall of Fame Games were aired on CBS Sports Network prior to the termination of the league's agreement with CBSN following the 2018 season.

Inductees
The list is complete up to date 2014 Hall of Fame class.

Class of 2015 Finalists:
 James Baron Offensive lineman/Defensive lineman for the Nashville Kats from 1997–2001, 2005–2007 and the Chicago Rush from 2002–2004 and 2008
 Craig Bornemeier Executive
 Siaha Burley Offensive Specialist for the Orlando Predators from 2001–2002, the Los Angeles Avengers from 2003, the Arizona Rattlers from 2004–2005, 2008, 2010, and the Utah Blaze from 2006–2007
 B. J. Cohen Offensive lineman/Defensive lineman for the Orlando Predators from 1999–2002, 2008, the Tampa Bay Storm from 2003, the New Orleans VooDoo from 2004–2005, and the Kansas City Brigade from 2006–2007
 Mark Grieb Quarterback for the Anaheim Piranhas from 1997, the Milwaukee Mustangs from 1997, and the San Jose SaberCats from 1999–2008, 2011–2012
 Jay Gruden Head Coach for the Orlando Predators from 1998–2001, 2004–2008. Gruden is already inducted for his playing career and thus would be the first to be inducted twice as the hall is currently configured.
 Kevin Guy Head Coach for the Tennessee Valley Vipers (AF2) from 2002–2004, the Rio Grande Valley Dorados (AF2) from 2005, and the Arizona Rattlers from 2008–present
 Kenny McEntyre Defensive Specialist for the Orlando Predators from 1998–2006, 2008–2012 and the Kansas City Brigade from 2007
 Steve Papin Offensive Specialist for the San Jose SaberCats from 1997–2001, the New York Dragons from 2002–2003, and the San Diego Riptide (AF2) from 2003
 Will Pettis Wide receiver/Defensive back for the  Pensacola Barracudas (AF2) from 2002, the Dallas Desperados from 2003–2008, and the Dallas Vigilantes from 2010

These were the finalists for the 2015 Hall of Fame class; however, this was the year that began the decline of the league until its second bankruptcy in 2019. No future Hall of Fame announcements have been made since 2015.

AF2 Hall of Fame Inductees
With the dissolvement of the AF2 developmental league, there was a single class of ten members inducted into the AF2 Hall of Fame. While this league was owned and run by the AFL, a separate Hall of Fame was created. AFL and AF2 creators Jim Foster and Jerry Kurz are the only members of both Halls. This Hall was designed to recognize individuals who significantly impacted the AF2. While some members have been involved with AFL teams, this group was inducted based only on their contributions to the AF2. No members have been inducted beyond the inaugural class.

Pro Football Hall of Fame
Joe DeLamielleure was the first Pro Football Hall of Fame inductee to ever play with an Arena Football Team; as an apparent publicity stunt, he played two games for the Charlotte Rage in the 1992 season, seven years after he had retired from professional football.

Kurt Warner, who played three seasons with the Iowa Barnstormers from 1995 to 1997 and was inducted into the Arena Football Hall of Fame in 2011, is the first player with substantial arena football experience to make the Pro Football Hall of Fame, as well as the first to be inducted into both halls. Warner was inducted into the Pro Football Hall of Fame in 2017.

The ownership group of the Colorado Crush has also been inducted: John Elway was inducted as a player in 2004, while Pat Bowlen was inducted as an owner in 2019. Both Elway and Bowlen were inducted almost entirely for their contributions to the NFL's Denver Broncos.

Indoor Football League Hall of Fame
The Indoor Football League Hall of Fame is the corresponding Hall of Fame for the Indoor Football League. While both the IFL and AFL Hall of Fames represent indoor football leagues, they are both separate. There are no members that have been enshrined into both Halls, nor have any members of the AFL Hall played in the IFL. There have been a few members of the IFL Hall of Fame that have played in the AFL, such as Chris Dixon, Lionell Singleton, Jameel Sewell, and Myniya Smith, but none had contributed enough to the AFL to earn entry into the Hall. However, there are some instances of former AFL teams that have been integrated into the IFL that have members enshrined for their tenure within the new league. The Green Bay Blizzard, Texas Revolution, and Tri-Cities Fever are former members of the AF2, but have since moved to the IFL. The Blizzard have had running back LaRon Council, defensive back/kick returner B. J. Hill, head coach Robert Fuller, quarterback Jameel Sewell, and wide receiver Bryan Pray enshrined. Lionell Singleton from the Fever has been enshrined. Javicz Jones	from the Revolution has been enshrined. The Iowa Barnstormers have moved from the AFL to the IFL and have had linebacker Javicz Jones and wide receiver Bryan Pray enshrined. Bryan Pray has also played for the Spokane Shock when they were in the IFL, but were known as the Spokane Empire then. Kevin Guy was inducted into the AF2 Hall of Fame and is still actively coaching in the IFL. Guy has made a prolific career in three separate indoor football leagues.

Canadian Football Hall of Fame
Only two players in the Canadian Football Hall of Fame have contributed to the Arena Football league; however, neither had a great enough contribution to be inducted in both Halls. Joe Kapp was inducted into the CFL Hall of Fame as a player in 1984 and coached for the Sacramento Attack in the AFL for the 1992 season. Bobby Jurasin was inducted in 2006 as a player and played with the Iowa Barnstormers for the 1999 season, unfortunately this was his last professional football season as he sustained a neck injury and was forced to retire.

See also
 Pro Football Hall of Fame
 Canadian Football Hall of Fame
 Indoor Football League Hall of Fame

References

External links
Official website

Arena Football League
American football museums and halls of fame
Football